Dom Duarte de Menezes (before 1488 – after 1539), was a 16th-century Portuguese nobleman and colonial officer, governor of Tangier from 1508 to 1521 and 1536 to 1539, and governor of Portuguese India from 1522 to 1524.

Background 

D. Duarte de Menezes was the eldest son of the powerful noble D. João de Meneses, 1st Count of Tarouca and Prior of Crato, and his wife D. Joana de Vilhena. He was named after his renowned grandfather, Duarte de Menezes, 3rd Count of Viana, captain of Alcácer-Ceguer.

Tangier 

In 1508, Duarte de Menezes succeeded his father as Portuguese captain of Tangier, a function he had already been effectively performing in his father's name since 1507. He carved out a formidable reputation as a military leader in numerous engagements around Tangier.

India 

In 1521, D. Duarte de Menezes was named by King Manuel I of Portugal as the next governor of Portuguese India, succeeding Diogo Lopes de Sequeira. Duarte de Menezes left Lisbon in April, 1521, with an armada of 11 carracks destined for India. He was accompanied by his brother D. Luís de Menezes, who captained one of the ships. On the outgoing leg, Menezes's armada was joined by a squadron of four ships, commanded by Martim Afonso de Mello, destined for China. Menezes's armada arrived in Goa at the end of August, 1521. He assumed office in early 1522, upon the departure of his predecessor.

D. Duarte de Menezes tenure as governor was considered disastrous. Accused of corruption, he was arrested by his successor, Vasco da Gama, in 1524, and sent back to Portugal. He was imprisoned for nearly seven years in the castle of Torres Vedras, before being finally released by the intercession of powerful friends including D. António de Ataíde, Count of Castanheira.

Tangier again 

The rehabilitation of Duarte de Menezes was sufficiently complete that in October 1536, he managed to be appointed to his old post as governor of Tangier. He held that post until January, 1539, when he handed over the government to his son, D. João de Meneses.

Duarte de Menezes lived out the remainder of his days in Portugal.

References

The Rise of Portuguese Power in India (1497–1550), p. 199
História de Tânger durante la dominacion portuguesa, by D. Fernando de Menezes, conde de la Ericeira, etc. traduccion del R. P. Buanaventura Diaz, O.F.M., Misionero del Vicariato apostólico de Marruecos. Lisboa Occidental. Imprenta Ferreiriana. 1732.
 Ignacio da Costa Quintella (1839) Annaes da Marinha Portugueza, Vol. 1, Lisbon: Academia Real das Sciencias.
The career and legend of Vasco da Gama, Sanjay Subrahmahnyam, Cambridge University Press, 1997.

External links 
 genealogy of D. Duarte de Menezes at geneall.com

Maritime history of Portugal
Viceroys of Portuguese India
History of Kerala
Portuguese colonial governors and administrators
Portuguese nobility
15th-century births
16th-century deaths
Governors of Tangier